Concerto Vocale is a Belgian musical ensemble for baroque music.

History 
Concerto Vocale was founded in Amsterdam in 1977 by the Belgian countertenor and conductor René Jacobs.

It is complemented by an instrumental ensemble including, among others, Jean Tubéry, William Dongois and Gottfried Bach.

Selected discography 
 1978: 3 Leçons de Ténèbres du Mercredy Sainct, H.96, H.97, H.98, 3 Répons du Mercrediy Sainct, H.111, H.112, H.113,  3 Leçons de Ténèbres du Jeudy Sainct, H.102, H.103, H.109 by Marc-Antoine Charpentier (recorded 08/1977 and 01/1978) 3 LP Harmonia Mundi HM 1005/6/7
 1979: 3 Leçons de Ténèbres du Vendredy Sainct, H.105, H.106, H.110, 6 Répons du Mercredy Sainct. H.114.H.115, H.116, H.117, H.118, H.119 by Marc-Antoine Charpentier (Volume 2, recorded 01/1978 and 01/1979) 2 LP Harmonia Mundi HM 1008/09
 1982: Madrigaux à 5 et 6 voix by Luca Marenzio
 1984: Lamento d'Arianna by Monteverdi
1984: Motets à voix seule et à 2 voix by Marc-Antoine Charpentier
 1984: Leçons de Ténèbres by François Couperin
 1984: Kleine Geistliche Konzerte by Heinrich Schütz
 
 1987: Duos et cantates by Carissimi (with Agnès Mellon)
 1990: Auferstehungs-Historie SWV 50 by Schütz
 1990: Weihnachts-Historie SWV 435 by Heinrich Schütz
 1990: Cantates Membra Jesu Nostri BuxWV 75 and Heut triumphieret Gottes Sohn BuxWV 43 by Dieterich Buxtehude
 1990: L'incoronazione di Poppea by Monteverdi
 1992: Il ritorno d'Ulisse in patria by Monteverdi
 1996: Vespro della Beata Vergine by Monteverdi
 1996: La Callisto by Francesco Cavalli (recorded at the Théâtre de la Monnaie in Brussels)
 2000: Giasone by Francesco Cavalli
 2000: Xerse by Francesco Cavalli
 2000: Stabat Mater by Pergolesi

External links 
 Bibliothèque nationale de France
 Concerto Vocale on Human Music
 Concerto Vocale on Harmonia Mundi
 Concerto Vocale on Discogs
 Concerto Vocale on France Musique (6 January 2015)
 Luca Marenzio, Madrigaux à 5 et 6 voix, Concerto Vocale, René Jacobs on YouTube

Baroque music groups
Belgian orchestras